Athens High School may refer to:

In Canada 
Athens District High School, Athens, Ontario

In the United States 
Athens High School (Alabama), Athens, Alabama
Athens High School (Georgia), Athens, Georgia (merged with Burney-Harris High School to form Clarke Central High School in 1970)
Athens High School (Illinois), Athens, Illinois
Athens High School (Louisiana), Athens, Louisiana
Athens High School (Athens, Michigan), Athens, Michigan
Athens High School (Troy, Michigan), Troy, Michigan
Coxsackie-Athens High School, Coxsackie, New York
Athens Drive High School, Raleigh, North Carolina
Athens High School (Ohio), The Plains, Ohio
Athens High School (Texas), Athens, Texas
Athens High School (Wisconsin), Athens, Wisconsin